KVPI (1050 kHz) is an AM radio station airing a hybrid classic country and talk radio format, licensed to Ville Platte, Louisiana. The station is owned by Ville Platte Broadcasting Co., Inc. The station began broadcasting in November 1953.

During the daytime, the station focuses on music and also includes French-language news 6 days a week. At night, the station switches to a syndicated talk format featuring The Mark Levin Show, The Savage Nation, Coast to Coast AM and Jim Bohannon's America in the Morning. Christian programming airs on Sundays, and the station offers tradio services in English and French.

References

External links
 KVPI's official website

French-American culture in Louisiana
Oldies radio stations in the United States
Radio stations in Louisiana
Foreign-language radio stations in the United States
Non-English-language radio stations in Louisiana
French-language mass media in the United States
Radio stations established in 1953
1953 establishments in Louisiana
French-language radio stations
Full service radio stations in the United States